Pardinas or Pardiñas may refer to:
 The town of Pardines, Girona
 Manuel Pardiñas
 Pardinyes, in Lleida
 General Pardiñas, who died in the First Carlist War

See also 
Pardina (disambiguation)